I Like Girls is a Canadian short animated film, directed by Diane Obomsawin and released in 2016. Based on Obomsawin's 2014 graphic novel On Loving Women, the film features anthropomorphic animal characters acting out stories of lesbian same-sex attraction.

The film won the prize for Best Short Film at the Ottawa International Animation Festival in 2016. It was a Canadian Screen Award nominee for Best Animated Short Film at the 5th Canadian Screen Awards, and a nominee for Best Animated Short film at the 19th Quebec Cinema Awards. It was submitted to the 2018 Academy Awards for the Academy Award for Best Animated Short Film, but was not selected as a finalist.

References

External links
 I Like Girls at the National Film Board of Canada
 

2016 films
2010s animated short films
National Film Board of Canada animated short films
Canadian LGBT-related short films
2016 LGBT-related films
LGBT-related animated films
French-language Canadian films
2010s Canadian films